Ralph Emerson (1912–1979) was an American botanist, academic, and professor at the University of California, Berkeley who made contributions to the fields of botany, biology, and mycology through his years of research and emphasis on aquatic and thermophilic fungi.

Biography 

Ralph Emerson was born in 1912 in New York City, the youngest of five children of Grace and Haven Emerson. Emerson spent his early life in New York City before attending Harvard University to obtain his Bachelors, Masters, and PhD successively. It was during this time that he began his research into aquatic fungi, specifically the Allomyces, a research passion that would continue with him for most of his academic career. Following his PhD, Emerson spent two years as a National Research Council fellow, one year back at Harvard as a research fellow, and in 1940 he began his career as a professor at the University of California – Berkeley. He remained at UC Berkeley for mostly the rest of his academic career, minus the two sabbaticals to Costa Rica. He married Enid Merle Budelman in 1942, together having two children, Peter and Grace Emerson. Throughout his life, Emerson contributed greatly to the scientific community, as well as through his dedicated and passionate teaching efforts before passing away after a year-long battle with cancer. Emerson died in 1979, at 67, survived by his wife, two children, and six grandchildren.

Areas of study 

Since the beginning of his academic career, Ralph Emerson had an interest in water molds, beginning with the genus Allomyces. His focus was broadly biological, focusing on growth and nutritional requirements, but with an ultimate goal of classification and biosystematics. One of his major contributions was a paper on they cytogenetics and cytotaxonomy of Allomyces. Beyond Allomyces and other common water molds, Emerson made major contributions with his research on Thermophiles, especially in Eumycota, on fermentative water molds, and in looking for low oxygen tolerant tropical water molds on his sabbaticals to Costa Rica.

Honors 

Emerson gained many offices and honors throughout his career, both in the United States as well as internationally. He held Guggenheim Fellowships for the academic years 1948–1949 and 1956–1957. He was elected a member of the National Academy of Sciences as well as the Academy of Arts and Sciences, and served as president of the Mycological Society of America and Botanical Society of America. He held international positions and was awarded as a fellow in multiple international organizations, and was a keynote speaker for the First International Mycological Congress. At the University of California, Berkeley, Emerson started as an instructor and worked his way up to professor, research professor, and finally chairman of the botany department.

Interesting notes 
In 1935, Emerson was a photographer for an expedition to the west coast of Mexico whose goal was to gather data and photographs of the local fish in order to put together a book on the Pacific Coastal game fish. According to a distinguished ichthyologist, Emerson's photos were some of the best he had ever seen.

References 

 Emerson, Ralph. "Mycological Organization". Mycologia 50.5 (1958): 589–621.
 Ainsworth, Geoffrey Clough, and Alfred S. Sussman, eds. The Fungal Population: An Advanced Treatise. Vol. 3. Elsevier, 2013.
 UC Berkeley Obituary: http://texts.cdlib.org/view?docId=hb1j49n6pv&doc.view=frames&chunk.id=div00033&toc.depth=1&toc.id= 
 Fuller, Melvin S. Ralph Emerson 1912–1979: A Biographical Memoir by Melvin S. Fuller. Washington D.C.: National Academy of Sciences, 1985. Print.
 http://botany.org/about_bsa/president.php
 Ingraham, John L., and Ralph Emerson. "Studies of the nutrition and metabolism of the aquatic phycomycete, Allomyces." American Journal of Botany (1954): 146–152.
 Emerson, Ralph, and E. C. Cantino. "The isolation, growth, and metabolism of Blastocladia in pure culture." American Journal of Botany (1948): 157–171.
 Emerson, Ralph. "Current trends of experimental research on the aquatic Phycomycetes." Annual Reviews in Microbiology 4.1 (1950): 169–200.
 Emerson, Ralph, and Abraham A. Held. "Aqualinderella fermentans gen. et sp. n., a phycomycete adapted to stagnant waters. II. Isolation, cultural characteristics, and gas relations." American Journal of Botany (1969): 1103–1120.

External links 

 Melvin S. Fuller, "Ralph Emerson", Biographical Memoirs of the National Academy of Sciences (1985)

American mycologists
American taxonomists
1912 births
1979 deaths
Botanists active in California
University of California, Berkeley faculty
Botanical Society of America
Harvard University alumni
Scientists from California
20th-century American botanists
Members of the United States National Academy of Sciences